Justus of Tiberias (Tiberias, ca. 35 AD - Galilee, ca 100 AD) was a 1st century  Jewish author and historiographer. All that we know of his life comes from the Vita which Flavius Josephus apparently wrote in response to the assertions made by Justus in his History of the Jewish War, published around 93/94 or shortly after 100. Josephus is moreover the only writer to mention this document, but without ever citing the slightest extract. This History published by Justus seems to have disappeared shortly after the publication of the Autobiography of Flavius ​​Josephus, because it is unknown to pagan authors and the Christian authors who mention it only quote what Josephus said.

After the Great Jewish Revolt (66-70), Justus was the secretary of King Agrippa II and waited until his death to publish his History of this revolt. He is also known as the author of two other writings which disappeared much later. Thus in the ninth century, Bishop Photios of Constantinople was still able to access a copy of the Chronicle of the Jewish Kings''' written by Justus.

Biographical elements
The Jewish Historian
Justus of Tiberias is a son of Pistos. Both are presented as authorities of the city of Tiberias when Flavius Josephus was governor of Galilee in 66/67. He is best known as a historiographer. None of his writings have come down to us, but three of them are mentioned by ancient authors. In his De viris illustribus (14), Jerome of Stridon mentions one of them which he calls Commentarioli de scriptura, a commentary on the biblical writings, corresponding to what the Christian tradition calls the Old Testament. A few Church Fathers read his Chronicle of the Jewish Kings, a copy of which Bishop Photios of Constantinople could still consult in the ninth century But the writing that makes us know it, although it seems to have disappeared almost immediately, is his History of the Jewish War, by the reaction it provoked in Flavius Josephus.

Justus accused of being responsible for the revolt
In response to the Justus's History, Josephus indeed published his Vita in order to counter various assertions which told a very different story from what the latter had published in his Jewish War twenty years earlier. He attacks Justus at length, even though he had not even mentioned him — nor his father Pistos — in The Jewish War written twenty years earlier. Most of what we know about Justus, moreover, comes from a long digression by Josephus who attacks him in this Vita (336-367). He criticizes him for multiplying the errors — but without citing any explicitly — and for “not having had access, unlike him, to the field notes of Vespasian and Titus".

To discredit his adversary, Josephus indicates that "in the comments of the emperor Vespasian", which Justus was unable to consult, it would be indicated that on the arrival of the future emperor at Ptolemais (spring 67) "the inhabitants of the Decapolis begged him to punish [Justus] as the author of all their evils". What Justus would have escaped only thanks to the clemency of King Agrippa II and at the request of Queen Berenice. According to Josephus, the reason for this questioning was the role that Justus would have played during the attack that the inhabitants of Tiberias carried out against Gadara, at the very beginning of the revolt, in autumn 66, when the Jewish towns began to attack the neighboring Greek cities and vice versa, even before the arrival of Josephus in Galilee. However, this accusation clearly did not succeed and it is obvious that Josephus reports these events in a biased and polemical way. Josephus presents Justus as someone who hesitated between siding with the revolt and who influenced his father Pistos, the only member of the aristocracy of Tiberias not to be a member of the pro-Roman party, led by Julius Capella. While the anti-Roman party was led by Jesus son of Sapphias who led a group of poor people and boatmen. Flavius ​​Josephus accuses him of having led “his country to revolt against the Romans”. 

However, despite Josephus' efforts to blame Justus for the uprising in Galilee, several facts he mentions in his Vita contradict this accusation. Thus, Justus was opposed to the destruction of Herod's palace in Tiberias, whereas on the contrary Josephus tried to obtain its destruction from the Council of the city. Josephus himself says that Justus was not a member of the pro-war faction, but the leader of a faction in intermediate positions. It is also possible that this third party is an invention of Josephus who could not make Justus the leader of the revolutionary party because it was far too well known that its leader was Jesus son of Sapphia. Some of Justus' close relatives were also killed by the revolutionaries in Gamla. Furthermore, Josephus states that he took him prisoner along with all the members of the council of Tiberias, because due to the invincibility of the Romans, this council had secretly pledged allegiance to King Agrippa and demanded that he send forces to take control of the city. Josephus would then have released them, recommending that they show duplicity because if he was well aware of the invincibility of the Romans, they had to pretend to support the war against Rome because of the "brigands" (lestai) Josephus appropriates here “the discriminatory vocabulary of the Romans. On several occasions in The Jewish War, he calls "brigands" the Jewish rebels, such as the Sicarii, the Zealots or the members of the Fourth philosophy. For Shaye J. D. Cohen, those who are called “brigands” in this passage were Josephus' own followers at the material time. Finally, even before Vespasian's offensive in Galilee (spring 67), Justus was no longer in Tiberias, but had joined King Agrippa in Beirut, when the latter was going to join his army with Vespasian's three legions to begin the reconquest of all of Palestine, starting with Galilee.

After the Great Jewish Revolt (66-70), he was imperial secretary at the court of Agrippa, king of Batanea and the eastern part of Galilee (Vita 356).

Justus accused of being a forger
Josephus compares Justus and all the historians who lie “out of hatred or partiality” to “forgers who fabricate false contracts (V § 337)". Then in the long digression in which Josephus attacks Justus (V 356), he suggests that if Agrippa drove Justus away and forbade him to "appear ever before him" from an indefinite moment, it was because he would have realized that he was being dishonest “in the office of secretary with which he [had] honored him." For Shaye J. D. Cohen,  “Josephus labels Justus as a forger, an accusation sometimes leveled against official secretaries,” which goes back to the comparison he made in § 337 between those who lie to fabricate a false story – as Justus, according to him, did – and “forgers who fabricate false contracts”. However, Josephus ends this passage by saying that “about all this [he] renounces to prove everything down to the detail".

It was only after Agrippa's death that Justus published his History of the Jewish War, which triggered the writing of the Vita' of Flavius ​​Josephus. The dates of publication of these two writings depend on the date of the death of Agrippa which occurs either in 92/93, or in 100. See on this subject the § Date of the death of Agrippa in the item Agrippa II.

After the publication of the Autobiography of Flavius ​​Josephus, the two men disappear from history.

Justus' History of the Jewish War
Justus' book about the great Jewish revolt was an account of the war (Vita 336 and 338) which included the campaign in Galilee, the actions of Josephus and which challenged his version of the siege of Jotapata (Vita 357). He also recounted the siege of Jerusalem (Vita 358). 

He also apparently disputed Josephus' version about  Philip of Bathyra and what had happened in Gamala and Batanea. It is mainly on these subjects that Josephus endeavors to answer at length, whereas he devotes only one sentence to answering the disputes of Justus about the siege of Iotapata - of which Josephus claims to have directed the defense - and to the about Josephus' version of the events that took place during the siege of Jerusalem (V 357-358).

If Justus had so many reasons to hate Flavius ​​Josephus, why did he wait 20 years (Vita 360) before attacking him in his writing? Josephus uses this expectation as proof of the lies of Justus. If he waited for the death of Vespasian, Titus, Agrippa II, and all those who knew the truth, it was because he knew that they would not have tolerated his lies. We therefore wondered if Justus did not attack Agrippa and the emperors, waiting for their death to publish “his truth”. However, there is no sign that he attacked a royal figure, Jewish or Roman. If that had been the case, it is unlikely that Josephus, who devotes a great deal of space to the attacks on Justus in his Vita, would not have mentioned them.

Disputing the veracity of the story told by Josephus
In his book, Justus declared to tell a superior story to those already published which took care to respect the historical facts. According to Josephus, he thus contradicted the memoirs of Vespasian  (Vita 358). He “falsely testified” against Josephus (Vita 338). The Vita of § 357 to 367 also implies that Justus was attacking the veracity of the Jewish War on certain points.

Josephus in Tiberias
Justus also held that Josephus and his army of Galileans were responsible for anti-Roman actions against his city of Tiberias (Vita 340 and 350). We can deduce from Vita 353 that Justus accused Josephus of brutality at Tiberias. When he arrived in Galilee the first thing that Flavius ​​Josephus recounts in his Vita is the destruction of the palace that King Agrippa possessed in Tiberias, followed by the murder of all the Greek inhabitants of the city. According to him, when he had not entered the city, he asked the authorities of Tiberias to destroy Herod's palace which contained paintings violating the aniconism advocated by certain tendencies of Judaism. While the council of Tiberias, in which the father of Justus sat, was very reluctant to carry out this decision which emanated from Jerusalem, the archon of the city who also led the anti-Roman tendency, Jesus son of Sapphia, would have set fire to the palace and killed all the Greek inhabitants of the city (V 66-67). For Shaye J. D. Cohen, this relationship is probably false. If he played no part in these events and in the subsequent looting of the palace, how could Josephus and the council of Tiberias control the spoils resulting from this looting? Josephus claims that he simply took this booty from the hands of the criminals and gave it to Julius Capella, leader of the tendency of those who wanted "to remain faithful to the Roman people and to their king" in order to preserve the interests of Agrippa (V 68-69). How could he control the loot if it had nothing to do with looting? Cohen speculates that Josephus and Jesus initially cooperated in destroying the palace and in the subsequent massacre.

But in fact it is only totally hypothetical and why did the events in Tiberias during the revolt become a problem thirty years after the events?

History of the Jewish War
One of the major differences between the Jewish War and the Vita is the frequent mention of Justus of Tiberias in the latter text, whereas Flavius ​​Josephus does not say a word about it, in what he had written twenty years earlier. The crucial question is: What was Justus saying in his History that necessitated such a reaction from Josephus?

Most of what we know about him comes from a long digression by Flavius ​​Josephus attacking Justus in his Autobiography (336-367).

If Justus had so many reasons to hate Flavius ​​Josephus, why did he wait 20 years (Vita 360) before attacking him in his writing? Josephus uses this expectation as proof of the lies of Justus. If he waited for the death of Vespasian, Titus, Agrippa, and all those who knew the truth, it was because he knew that they would not have tolerated his lies (359-360). We therefore wondered if Justus did not attack Agrippa and the emperors, waiting for their death to publish “his truth”. However, there is no sign that he attacked a royal figure, Jewish or Roman. If that had been the case, it is unlikely that Josephus, who devotes a great deal of space to the attacks on Justus in his Vita, would not have mentioned them.

Flavius Josephus, official writer of the Flavians
In his Vita, Josephus confirms that his “narrative of the war is made from the Roman point of view” and that “what Rome represents for Josephus, beyond the real or supposed favors with which he was showered, is the State, the State of divine right. He also writes: “The Emperor Titus wanted the knowledge of these events to be spread to the public only from my books alone, so much so that he initialed them with his own hand and ordered their publication".

If this attitude of Titus became an imperial policy continued after his death, it perhaps explains the rapid disappearance of Justus of Tiberias' book on the History of Jewish Warfare.

Works
Justus's works have been lost and they currently survive only in small fragments from other works: Justus is the author of a War of the Jews, probably written in Greek, which he only publishes after the death of Agrippa (92 ou 100) whom he presents in an unfavorable light. This work is mentioned by Eusebius of Caesarea and Jerome. of Stridon, but indirectly, Flavius having probably worked for the disappearance of the work of his rival.

He is also the author of a Chronicle of the Jewish Kings from Moses to Agrippa II, briefly summarized by Photius. Photius of Constantinople describes it as being written in sketchy forms. It is likely that several later authors used this material in their own works, such as Sextus Julius Africanus, Eusebius, Diogenes Laërtius; and the Byzantine historian George Syncellus.  Commenting this Chronicle, Photios laments that Justus failed to make any mention of Jesus of Nazareth.

According to Jerome, Justus also wrote a Brief commentary of the Holy Scriptures, but no other references of that work survives and it is unclear whether it was an authentic work or a pseudoepigrapha.

Notes and references

Explanatory notes

Citations

General sources 

 .
 

 .
 .
 .
 . 
 . 
 . 
 . 
 . 
 . 
 . 
 . 
 . 
 . 
 . 
 . 
 . 
 . 
 . 
 . 
 .

External links
Jewish Encyclopedia on Justus

Jewish historians
1st-century historians
People from Tiberias
Year of birth unknown
Year of death unknown